The Communauté d'agglomération du Boulonnais, created in January 2000, is a communauté d'agglomération (an intercommunal structure) centered on the city of Boulogne-sur-Mer. It is located in the Pas-de-Calais department, in the Hauts-de-France region in northern France. Its area is 205.1 km2. Its population was 112,836 in 2018, of which 40,664 in Boulogne-sur-Mer proper.

Composition
The communauté d'agglomération consists of the following 22 communes:

Baincthun
Boulogne-sur-Mer
La Capelle-lès-Boulogne
Condette
Conteville-lès-Boulogne
Dannes
Echinghen
Équihen-Plage
Hesdigneul-lès-Boulogne
Hesdin-l'Abbé
Isques
Nesles
Neufchâtel-Hardelot
Outreau
Pernes-lès-Boulogne
Pittefaux
Le Portel
Saint-Étienne-au-Mont
Saint-Léonard
Saint-Martin-Boulogne
Wimereux
Wimille

See also
 Côte d'Opale
 Boulonnais

References

External links
 Official website: Communauté d'agglomération du Boulonnais (in French)
 Official website: Tourism in Boulogne sur Mer and the Boulonnais area (in English)

Boulonnais
Boulonnais